St Andrews Beach is a coastal village in the southern extremity of the Mornington Peninsula in Melbourne, Victoria, Australia,  south of Melbourne's Central Business District, located within the Shire of Mornington Peninsula local government area. St Andrews Beach recorded a population of 974 at the 2021 census.

St Andrews Beach is located on the Bass Strait side of the Mornington Peninsula and it is south of Rye. It is a popular surf location with many good breaks that attracts surfers all year round.

The settlement was first subdivided in 1959 and the subdivision was originally marketed as "Capri Beach". In 1962 a golf course (since closed) was constructed and the subdivision was re-marketed as St. Andrews by the Sea. Originally the homes that were built were small holiday homes but later in the 20th century more substantial homes began to be built as its location became more appreciated. At this time the name St Andrews Beach was adopted by the Council as its official name. Along with much of the Mornington Peninsula, land prices increased dramatically in 2020 and 2021.

St Andrews Beach is in the local government area of the Shire of Mornington Peninsula. At the 2001 census, St Andrews Beach had a population of 664, at the 2007 Census the population was 769, at the 2011 Census the population was 1,138, and at the 2016 Census, the population was 889. 

St Andrews Beach features a unique topography known as The Cups Country, which creates an ideal environment for golf courses. Golfers have a choice of several nearby golf courses including the St Andrews Beach Club on Sandy Road, Moonah Links off Truemans Road, and The Dunes on Browns Road.

It is known for its good surf and while popular with experienced surfers, the beach’s history of dangerous rips, fast changing conditions and lack of lifeguards means swimmers should instead choose to swim at one of the Peninsula’s ‘front beaches.’

See also
 Shire of Flinders – St Andrews Beach was previously within this former local government area.
 St Andrews Beach House

References

External links
 
 St Andrews Beach Weather Station
 St Andrews Beach Tides

Suburbs of the Shire of Mornington Peninsula
Coastal towns in Victoria (Australia)
Suburbs of Melbourne
Beaches of Victoria (Australia)